"Gone" is the second single released by the Belgian dance group Lasgo after the addition of Jelle Van Dael on vocals.

Track listing
CD Maxi-Single (Belgium and United States)
"Gone" (Radio Edit) – 3:00
"Gone" (Extended Mix) – 4:51
"Gone" (Sebastian Dali Remix) – 6:44
"Gone" (Felix Project Remix) – 4:51

12" Vinyl (Belgium)
A1. "Gone" (Extended Mix) – 4:51
A2. "Gone" (Felix Project Remix) – 4:51
B. "Gone" (Sebastian Dali Remix) – 6:44

Release history

Chart performance

Weekly charts

Year-end charts

References

2009 singles
Lasgo songs
2009 songs
Songs written by Basto (musician)
Songs written by Peter Luts